The Ally 400 is a NASCAR Cup Series race at Nashville Superspeedway in Gladeville, Tennessee. The first race took place in 2021, the first Cup event in the Nashville area since 1984.

The NASCAR Xfinity Series and NASCAR Camping World Truck Series host support races with the Tennessee Lottery 250 and Rackley Roofing 200, respectively.

History
The Cup Series last raced in the Nashville area in 1984 at Fairgrounds Speedway. Nashville Superspeedway, a  oval in Gladeville near the town of Lebanon, opened in 2001 with the NASCAR Busch Series conducting the inaugural event. NASCAR chairman Bill France Jr. was present at the track's opening on April 11, while Cup drivers Dale Earnhardt, Bobby Hamilton, Sterling Marlin, and Darrell Waltrip were honorees. Seating capacity was 50,000, which was not considered enough for a Cup crowd at the time, though Denis McGlynn of track operator Dover Motorsports noted in 1999 that the stands could be doubled or tripled should it receive a Cup race.

The NASCAR Craftsman Truck Series, ARCA Re/Max Series, and IndyCar Series would also race at the track during the 2000s. However, the superspeedway struggled with attendance and lost its NASCAR races after the 2011 season. Nashville's post-NASCAR use would be limited to stock car driving experiences and car storage by Nissan as the manufacturer had a plant in nearby Smyrna; Dover Motorsports placed the track on the market and attempted to close sales several times but saw each attempted sale fall through.

Starting in 2019 there was discussion that NASCAR would return the Cup Series to Fairgrounds Speedway, with Speedway Motorsports negotiating to promote the event; NASCAR's other major series, the then-Busch Series and Craftsman Truck Series, had last run there in 2000. However, on June 3, 2020, in what was considered a surprise announcement, Dover Motorsports announced the superspeedway would join the Cup Series schedule for the first time in 2021, replacing a date at Dover International Speedway on a four-year agreement. Nevertheless, negotiations continued for a race at Fairgrounds Speedway, possibly beginning in 2022.

On January 19, 2021, Ally Financial announced it acquired the naming rights for the race, dubbing it the Ally 400. The event was scheduled to be part of a tripleheader with the NASCAR Xfinity Series and NASCAR Camping World Truck Series; the Cup Series race was broadcast on NBCSN. The tripleheader event returned for 2022, with the Cup race being broadcast on NBC and later on USA Network after a rain delay. In 2023, possibly due to the popularity of the 2022's event finishing under the lights, the event will become a night race.

Past winners

Multiple winners (teams)

Manufacturer wins

References

External links
 

NASCAR Cup Series races
 
Annual sporting events in the United States